Kangna is a village in Nakodar in Jalandhar district of Punjab State, India. It is located 11.7 km from Nakodar, 33.5 km from Kapurthala, 35.3 km from district headquarter Jalandhar and 167 km from state capital Chandigarh. The village is administrated by a sarpanch who is an elected representative of village as per Panchayati raj (India).

Transport 
Nakodar railway station is the nearest train station. The village is 74 km away from domestic airport in Ludhiana and the nearest international airport is located in Chandigarh also Sri Guru Ram Dass Jee International Airport is the second nearest airport which is 110 km away in Amritsar.

Locality 
Most of Arain families were living in this village. Very before to the Partition of Indo Pak of 1947 One of these Families moved to Pakistan. A very famous family of Ramay which is actually sub-caste of Arain. who are now living in Faisalabad Pakistan was also residential of Kangna Village of Nakodar. Still related to Goods transportation. Familiar in Faisalabad with name of Doaba Goods transport company Faisalabad. Many families were familiar at their time But after to Partition they lost their Identity. We are the only who knows about our ancestry. And also do know about our Village kangna. 
Umair Riaz Ahmad Ramay. 

Another well-known Ramay Arain family of Master (Haji) Allah Rassi moved to Kot Charhat Singh, Tehsil Depalpur, District Okara, Pakistan. At the time of partition, Master Allah Rassi was posted in Farid Kot, Tehsil Depalpur, hence he shifted his family to a nearby village and permanently settled there. 
Mohsin Ramay.

Another Arain Family of Imam Din and his Son Muhammad Baksh migrated from Kangna about 20 years before partition to Punjab now in Pakistan and finally permanently settled in near by village of Hasilpur Dist. BahawalPur.  
Qaisar Raza  

Villages in Jalandhar district
One Ramay family from Kanghna settled in Chak 193/RB Faisalabad. The head of this family Ali Muhammad  
Son of Roshan Din and his younger son Manzoor Ahmed has been died while the older son Khushi Muhammad and their sons are still living in chak 193/RB Shirin Wala